West Orange is a city in Orange County, Texas. The population was 3,459 at the 2020 census, up from 3,443 at the 2010 census. It is part of the Beaumont–Port Arthur Metropolitan Statistical Area.

Geography
West Orange is located at  (30.080716, –93.756448).

Demographics

As of the 2020 United States census, there were 3,459 people, 1,289 households, and 987 families residing in the city.

As of the 2000 census, there were 4,111 people, 1,672 households, and 1,183 families residing in the city. The population density was 1,297.5 people per square mile (500.7/km). There were 1,876 housing units at an average density of 592.1 per square mile (228.5/km). The racial makeup of the city was 92.92% White, 1.85% African American, 0.34% Native American, 0.61% Asian, 2.38% from other races, and 1.90% from two or more races. Hispanic or Latino of any race were 5.77% of the population.

There were 1,672 households, out of which 30.3% had children under the age of 18 living with them, 52.7% were married couples living together, 12.8% had a female householder with no husband present, and 29.2% were non-families. 25.8% of all households were made up of individuals, and 12.3% had someone living alone who was 65 years of age or older. The average household size was 2.46 and the average family size was 2.92.

In West Orange, the population was spread out, with 24.5% under the age of 18, 8.6% from 18 to 24, 27.7% from 25 to 44, 21.6% from 45 to 64, and 17.6% who were 65 years of age or older. The median age was 37 years. For every 100 females, there were 94.8 males. For every 100 females age 18 and over, there were 91.1 males.

The median income for a household in the city was $32,224, and the median income for a family was $40,167. Males had a median income of $35,225 versus $19,286 for females. The per capita income for the city was $15,850. About 11.2% of families and 13.2% of the population were below the poverty line, including 14.3% of those under age 18 and 15.9% of those age 65 or over.

Education
West Orange is served by two school districts. Areas east of State Highway 87 are part of the West Orange-Cove Consolidated Independent School District and areas to the west of State Highway 87 are part of the Bridge City Independent School District.

References

External links

 City of West Orange Official website
 West Orange, TX at City-Data.com

Cities in Orange County, Texas
Cities in Texas
Cities in the Beaumont–Port Arthur metropolitan area